Moon shrimp cake,, is a popular Taiwanese xiaochi that is usually served in local Thai restaurants. Shrimp, garlic, and pork fat are pounded then spread on a circular spring roll wrapper. Another wrapper is placed over top and the cake is panfried and served with sweet chili sauce. The name is said to derive from the shape of the cake that results, like a golden full moon.

See also
 Taiwanese cuisine
 Fishcake

References

Taiwanese cuisine
Snack foods